Anastasia Vedyakova (born 1991) is a violinist, composer and conductor. She is the Soloist of the Philharmonic, member of BMI, the National Union of Composers, the Boston New Music Initiative, the Recordig Academy, International Society for Jazz Arrangers and Composers, the International Association for Music and Medicine.  She is the only Russian holder of the Elgar Medal. She's the winner and nominee for more than 35 international music awards as a violinist, composer, conductor and singer-songwriter, also the Grammys® balloted artist.

Life
Vedyakova was born in 1991 and she began to play the violin when she was four. By 1998 she was welcomed into the Central Music School at the Moscow State Tchaikovsky Conservatory, where she studied with Prof. E. Grach and Prof. A.Koblyakov. She graduated with honours from the conservatory in 2014. Then she studied at the Contemporary Classical Music Department till 2017 when she has become a Soloist at the Philharmonic. September 2022, Anastasia received a diploma with honors as a conductor and joined the International Conductors Guild (the US) as the Member. She has won 18 awards as a conductor, including the King's Peak International Music Competition (2023). She's also the Laureate at the London Classical Music Competition as a classical vocalist (contralto).  

She was a fellow of the Rostropovich Foundation.

Vedyakova was nominated as "Musician of the Year" for the Josie Music Awards in 2021.  Anastasia Vedyakova was the only composer from Russia as a participant of KLK New Music, the winner of "The 6th International Composers' Competition for the 6th International Wind/Percussion Competition".

She takes part in international music and music therapy conferences, and publishes articles as a musicologist.

The American Friction Quartet was the first ensemble to record her "Mirage".

In February 2022, Vedyakova and organist Anastasia Bykova performed the World Premiere of a work by Grammy-nominated composer Nadeem Majdalany, which he composed especially for the duet; there were also six Russian premieres of works by such composers as Danaë Xanthe Vlasse, Thomas Nazziola, John Finbury, Sherban Nichifor and Antoine Auberson.

March 2022, she won Rome Music Video Awards for her Sonata "A War Zone". April 2022, Anastasia won 3 Gold and 1 Silver One Earth Awards for her music.

On August 12th, 2022, she has released her eight album "ConTempoRary Violin" featuring music by J. S. Bach and 5 living composers from 5 countries. 

August 2022, Anastasia and the great-great-grandson of the famous composer Reinhold Gliere won Euro Music Video Awards for their work "The Music of Our Victory".

August 2022, Anastasia won ISSA International Rising Star Awards and the Red Carpet Award Show in Holland Best Female Musician of the Year. 

September 10th, 2022, the album "It Arrives" by Iranian composer Mehdi Rajabian has been released. Anastasia performed the lead violin on this album. 

She has an official registered artist's alias.

Performances
She is the first performer of the music by Jan Tamzejian, Tayren Ben-Abraham, Jay Reise, Colette Mourey, András Derecskei, Nadeem Majdalany, Wajdi About Diab. 

2019, she had a solo recital together with Simon Smith during the Saint-Petersburg International Cultural Forum.

Vedyakova has given performances at the Moscow Conservatory halls, Zaryadye Hall, and the Evangelical Lutheran Cathedral.

References

1991 births
Living people
Russian violinists
Russian composers